Job Bulters (born 22 March 1986) is a Dutch former professional footballer who played as a goalkeeper.

Club career
Bulters made his breakthrough for AZ's first squad in 2006, when first and second keeper, Joey Didulica and Khalid Sinouh, were injured. After some luckless games, AZ brought Ronald Waterreus to the club as a replacement. Bulters' contract was not extended at the end of the season. Therefore, he continued his career at Stormvogels Telstar, making his debut on 11 April 2008 in a 0–3 loss to FC Den Bosch, which would prove to be his only appearance for the club. The following season he was signed as the backup goalkeeper behind Ruud Boffin at MVV Maastricht.

On 19 August 2012 he signed a one-year deal with Helmond Sport. He moved abroad to play for Belgian side Turnhout, only to return to the Netherlands a year later to join amateurs EHC Hoensbroek. He announced his retirement a year later.

International career
In 2005, he was part of the Dutch squad at the FIFA World Youth Championship.

References

External links

1986 births
Living people
Footballers from Haarlem
Association football goalkeepers
Dutch footballers
Netherlands under-21 international footballers
Netherlands youth international footballers
AZ Alkmaar players
SC Telstar players
MVV Maastricht players
Helmond Sport players
KFC Turnhout players
EHC Hoensbroek players
Eredivisie players
Eerste Divisie players
Dutch expatriate footballers
Expatriate footballers in Belgium
Dutch expatriate sportspeople in Belgium